The Diocese of Hallam is a Latin Church ecclesiastical territory or diocese of the Catholic Church in England. The diocese comprises the whole of the City of Sheffield, and the surrounding towns of Rotherham, Doncaster, Barnsley, Chesterfield, the Peak District and areas of Worksop and Retford. It is a suffragan diocese in the ecclesiastical province of the metropolitan Archdiocese of Liverpool.

Erection of the Diocese
The diocese was erected on 30 May 1980 by Pope John Paul II, by removing territory from the Diocese of Leeds and the Diocese of Nottingham. It is one of the six suffragan sees that fall under the ecclesiastical Province of Liverpool (also known as the Northern province).

The diocese derives its name from Hallamshire, an ancient name for the Sheffield area. It is under the patronage of Our Lady of Perpetual Succour, whose feast is celebrated as a solemnity in the diocese on 27 June.

The first Bishop of Hallam was Gerald Moverley, who resigned in July 1996 and died later that year.  The second bishop was John Rawsthorne, who had previously been an auxiliary bishop of Liverpool and titular bishop of Rotdon. The third and current incumbent is Ralph Heskett, C.Ss.R., who had previously been Bishop of Gibraltar.

The diocesan Cathedral is the Cathedral Church of St. Marie in the city centre of Sheffield.

Deanery structure

The parishes included in the Diocese of Hallam are organised into six deaneries.

Bishops of the Diocese of Hallam

References

External links
Official website
The Latin Mass Society in The RC Diocese of Hallam
GCatholic.org
Hallam (Diocese). Catholic Hierarchy (accessed 25 May 2014).

 
Christianity in Yorkshire
Hallam
Roman Catholic dioceses and prelatures established in the 20th century
Roman Catholic Ecclesiastical Province of Liverpool